Ten Mile Creek is a census designated place in Montgomery County, Maryland, United States. It first appeared as a CDP prior to the 2020 Census with a population was 1,012.

Demographics

2020 census

Note: the US Census treats Hispanic/Latino as an ethnic category. This table excludes Latinos from the racial categories and assigns them to a separate category. Hispanics/Latinos can be of any race.

References

Census-designated places in Montgomery County, Maryland
Census-designated places in Maryland